Bathynomus decemspinosus is a species of aquatic crustacean of the order Isopoda. It is known from the West Pacific (Taiwan) and has been found dwelling in coastal waters of the Indian Ocean.

References

Cymothoida
Crustaceans of the Pacific Ocean
Crustaceans described in 1972